Khanbogd is a sum (district) of Ömnögovi Province in southern Mongolia. In 2009, its population was 3,154.

Khanbogd is also home to Demchigiin Khiid, a monastery built by Danzan Ravjaa.  The monastery was destroyed in 1937, but has since been rebuilt by funds from the company that operates the Oyu Tolgoi mine.

The Khanbumbat Airport, located in Khanbogd, opened in February 2013.

Climate
Khanbogd has a cold desert climate (Köppen BWk).

References

Districts of Ömnögovi Province